The Great Fire of London is a novel by the English author Peter Ackroyd.

Published in 1982, it is Ackroyd's first novel. It established themes which Ackroyd returns to again and again in his fiction: London, English literature and the intertwining (and blurring) of literary, historical and contemporary events.

Critical reception
The novel received generally positive reviews on its publication, although many reviewers have subsequently reassessed it in the light of Hawksmoor three years later, which had a similar focus albeit with a different historical perspective. Ackroyd however has dismissed the novel outright.

References

1982 British novels
Novels set in London
Novels by Peter Ackroyd
Hamish Hamilton books
1982 debut novels